Late for Dinner is a 1991 American science fiction drama film directed by W. D. Richter and starring Peter Berg, Brian Wimmer and Marcia Gay Harden. The supporting cast features Peter Gallagher and Richard Steinmetz, along with Janeane Garofalo's first film appearance, briefly playing a cashier during a comical sequence in a burger joint.

Plot
In 1962, best friends and brothers-in-law Willie Husband (Brian Wimmer) and simple-minded Frank Lovegren (Peter Berg) are running from the police because Willie shot and killed a man. It was self-defense, but a witness intends to frame them both for kidnapping and murder.

Frank explains what happened: Willie, his wife Joy (Marcia Gay Harden), and little daughter Jess (Cassy Friel) live a happy life in Santa Fe, New Mexico, where Joy's brother, Frank, lives with them. Willie lost his job at the milk company, and they have fallen behind in house payments. They learn the bank intends to foreclose, so Willie pays a visit to the banker, Bob Freeman (Peter Gallagher), to show that he made up the back payments with funds borrowed from relatives. Freeman takes Willie's receipt and burns it, then offers to buy his house for less than it's worth. He is building a huge, new home development in the area, and he needs all the land in Willie's neighborhood to do it. Willie refuses to undersell or to bow to pressure, and destroys an expensive chair and rug before storming out of the office. That's the last straw for Freeman, and he vows revenge.

On the drive home, Willie discovers Frank "borrowed" Freeman's little boy, Donald (Ross Malinger), because Frank realized the boy was being emotionally abused by his father. He pleads to Willie to let him keep Donald, as he is small and won't eat much. When they get home, Joy convinces Willie they have to accept the lowball offer and just get out while they can. Willie calls Freeman to tell him that he will accept his offer after all, and that, by the way, his son had somehow "wedged himself into the back seat" of his car. Realizing this is his chance to get what he wants, Freeman accuses Willie of kidnapping. They agree to meet in the desert just outside town, Willie believing it is only to return the boy and to get the $9,000 Freeman offered for his house.

Once they are face to face, Freeman produces an envelope filled with $15,000, intending to make this look like a ransom exchange. Freeman and his henchman then both pull guns, right in front of little Donald, as Freeman admits he was the one who got Willie fired from his job so he would be unable to pay his mortgage, making it possible for him to buy the house for a low price. He is confident Donald will tell the police whatever he says to tell them, and as he aims his gun, Willie jumps Freeman, and the henchman shoots Willie in the shoulder. Freeman reaches for the gun, but Frank tackles him and knocks him out. The henchman aims his gun at Frank, but Willie manages to shoot the man in the chest. It was self-defense, but they know Freeman will claim otherwise. They have to leave Donald there and take off before the police arrive, whom Freeman called before he got there. They try to stop at home first, but they can see police cars are already there. Willie's little daughter sees them coming, and silently shakes her head to tell them not to stop, so, sadly, they drive away. They don't realize this is the last time they may ever see Joy and Jess.

After escaping for hours through the desert, they come across Dr. Dan Chilblains (Bo Brundin) in Pomona, California. Willie has passed out, but the doctor fixes up his wound, and discovers that Frank has glomerulonephritis, which will eventually kill him. Chilblains has invented a procedure that can freeze a human being without killing him, and convinces Frank to let him freeze them both until Frank can be treated for kidney disease – maybe even get a new kidney (a procedure that is not widely known in 1962) – and to hide them from the police. Excited by the prospect of being cured, Frank agrees, and assumes the unconscious Willie will be okay with it. The doctor allows Frank to think it's just like sleeping, and it will only be for a little while. He sedates them, then Chilblains' colleagues show up, and reluctantly help him prepare the men for the cryogenic process.

Twenty-nine years later, in 1991, a truck crashes, destroying and flooding the cryogenic storage facility, and causing the tanks storing the two men to burst open. Willie and Frank, in body bags, are revived by floating in electrified water. Suddenly regaining consciousness, they escape from the bags, freezing, wet, and feeling confused. Once they get their wits about them, they decide they need to get back to Santa Fe, assuming Joy and Jess will be there waiting. Dr. Chilblains left them clothing, $100, and a note that doesn't really explain much. They are starving and go to buy food. The culture shock, high prices, and modern technology are amazing and overwhelming to them. Frank realizes he needs his medication, so they visit a hospital, which is where they finally learn the date and what actually happened to them.

They manage to get back to Santa Fe and track down Willie's daughter, Jess (Colleen Flynn), who is now grown up with "her own telephone number… her own house." Seeing Jess all grown up, only now does Frank accept that so much time has passed. Once she calms down, she explains to Willie that Joy had to move on; she married someone else, but is now divorced, because her second husband just didn't measure up to the standard set by her first husband. She also told him that Joy stood up to Freeman; she managed to keep their home, and she exposed Freeman's scam. Freeman then went away and built half of Phoenix, and eventually someone murdered him.

Willie and Jess leave Frank at her house, and go to Joy's house to meet her. While they're gone, Frank meets Jess' husband, who turns out to be Donald Freeman (Richard Steinmetz). At Joy's house, Jess makes her sit down and listen to Willie explain, but to keep her back turned and not look at him. When she finally does look, she has trouble accepting the fact that he hasn't aged, and says they can never be together again because too much has changed and she is too old. Willie manages to woo her back by reminding her why he loved her, that he still loves her, and he knows she hasn't changed.

Finally, through a series of "home movies" and photographs, their renewed lives together are revealed, including the fact that Joy donated a kidney to save Frank's life.

Cast

Release

Critical reception
The film received a 58% rating at Rotten Tomatoes.

Box office
The film was released September 20, 1991 and took in just under $9 million.

Home media
The film was released on VHS on April 29, 1992 by New Line Home Video and SVS/Triumph.

It was re-released on VHS on June 23, 1998 by MGM Home Entertainment under the Movie Time Label.

It was eventually released on DVD on December 31, 2009. It was released on Blu-ray from Kino Lorber on March 24, 2015.

References

External links
 
 
 

1991 films
American science fiction comedy-drama films
1990s science fiction comedy-drama films
Cryonics in fiction
Castle Rock Entertainment films
Columbia Pictures films
New Line Cinema films
Films directed by W. D. Richter
Films scored by David Mansfield
Films set in 1962
Films set in 1991
1990s English-language films
1990s American films